Beaumontia grandiflora, the Easter lily vine, herald's trumpet, or Nepal trumpet flower, is a species of flowering plant in the family Apocynaceae. It is native to the eastern Indian Subcontinent, southern China, and mainland Southeast Asia, and has been introduced to a number of locales in Central America. With its vining habit and trumpet-shaped flowers it is widely cultivated as an ornamental.

References

Apocyneae
Garden plants of Asia
Ornamental plants
Vines
Flora of India (region)
Flora of Nepal
Flora of East Himalaya
Flora of Bangladesh
Flora of Assam (region)
Flora of Yunnan
Flora of Guangxi
Flora of Indo-China
Flora of Peninsular Malaysia
Plants described in 1824